Hankou University is a public university in Jiangxia District, Wuhan, China. It was an affiliated public college of Huazhong Normal University at first, and then was approved by the Chinese Ministry of Education in 2000 to become an independent public university. The school initially chose Hankou as the location of its campus, and thus was named after "Hankou", but decided to move to Jiangxia before it started operation.

References

Universities and colleges in Wuhan